Epipsilia is a genus of moths of the family Noctuidae.

Species
 Epipsilia cervantes (Reisser, 1935)
 Epipsilia grisescens (Fabricius, 1794)
 Epipsilia latens (Hübner, [1809])

References
Natural History Museum Lepidoptera genus database
Epipsilia at funet

Noctuinae